1 January - Security forces killed a rebel group leader in Chechnya.
28 February - Five members of the Interior Ministry of RF were wounded during  explosion of  an unknown explosive device in a woods area of the Urus-Martan district of Chechnya and were  taken to hospital.
22 November - Russian special forces kill 10 ISIS-linked militants in a counter-terrorist operation in a mountainous region near the city of Nalchik in Russia's North Caucasus.
29 December - A gunman opened fire on a group of local residents who were visiting a viewing platform at the fortress in Derbent, Dagestan, southern Russia, killing one and injuring 11. ISIL claims responsibility.
30 December - Unidentified gunman opened fire on a group of local residents who were visiting a viewing platform at the fortress in Derbent, Dagestan, southern Russia, killing one and injuring 11. The visitors included two border guards, one of whom was killed in the attack. No group claimed responsibility.

See also
List of clashes in the North Caucasus in 2009
List of clashes in the North Caucasus in 2011
List of clashes in the North Caucasus in 2012
List of clashes in the North Caucasus in 2014
List of clashes in the North Caucasus in 2016
List of clashes in the North Caucasus in 2017
List of clashes in the North Caucasus in 2018
List of clashes in the North Caucasus in 2019

References

Clashes in the North Caucasus
Clashes in the North Caucasus
North Caucasus
Lists of clashes in the North Caucasus
Lists of armed conflicts in 2015